Jacques Witkowski (born 21 January 1963) is a French civil servant. From 30 January 2013 until 30 July 2014 he served as the Prefect of Mayotte. He was succeeded by Seymour Morsy.

Honours
Witkowski is a recipient of the Legion of Honour

References

Living people
1963 births
French civil servants
People from Le Creusot
Prefects of Mayotte